"Sauce It Up" is a song by American rapper Lil Uzi Vert from their debut album Luv Is Rage 2 (2017). It was released as the album's third single to urban contemporary radio on February 27, 2018. The track was produced by Don Cannon and written by Cannon and Lil Uzi Vert. It peaked at number 49 on the US Billboard Hot 100.

Chart performance
"Sauce It Up" debuted at number 49 on the Billboard Hot 100 for the chart dated September 23, 2017.

Charts

Weekly charts

Year-end charts

Year-end charts

Certifications

References

2017 songs
2018 singles
Lil Uzi Vert songs
Songs written by Lil Uzi Vert
Song recordings produced by Don Cannon
Songs written by Don Cannon